Dan Gheorghe Dungaciu (born October 3, 1968) is a Romanian sociologist.

Biography
He was born in Târgu Mureș. He graduated from the University of Bucharest in 1995 and received his Ph.D. in 2002. He teaches at the University of Bucharest. He served as Secretary of State in the Ministry of Foreign Affairs of Romania.

Dungaciu obtained Moldovan citizenship on July 16, 2010, when he became an advisor for European Integration for president Mihai Ghimpu. He married Moldovan journalist Stela Popa in October 2012.

On Republic of Moldova
Dungaciu is a supporter of the Romanian language in the Republic of Moldova. In 2022 he wrote that the Chisinau Government can introduce the Romanian language into the Constitution of the Republic of Moldova without a vote in Parliament. 

Dungaciu has been a supporter of Moldovan President Maia Sandu and has acurattely predicted that her party would get a good result in the early elections of 2021. Dungaciu characterised Maia Sandu as a winner and affirmed that Sandu would be capable of calling early elections.

Awards
Dan Dungaciu is laureate of the Dimitrie Gusti prize for sociology offered by the Romanian Academy (1995) and the International Prize for Sociology of the University of Istanbul (2001). In 2009, the interim President of Moldova Mihai Ghimpu signed a decree on bestowing an Order of Honour on Dan Dungaciu.

Works 

 Sociologia şi geopolitica frontierei (coauthor), 2 volume, 1995.
 Istoria sociologiei. Teorii contemporane (coautor), 1996.
 "Reţelele omeniei" şi reţelele mistificării, 1997.
 Enciclopedia valorilor reprimate, 2 volume, 2000 (coautor)
 Statul şi comunitatea morală. Memorii (1904–1910), Traian Brăileanu, (ediţie îngrijită, studiu introductiv şi repere bibliografice de Dan Dungaciu), 2002.
 Sociologia românească interbelică în context european, 2002.
 Naţiunea şi provocările (post)modernităţii, 2002.
 Moldova ante portas, 2005.
 Cine suntem noi? Cronici de la Est de Vest, Editura Cartier, Colectia Cartier Istoric, 2009.

External links 
 Pagina conferenţiarului universitar dr. Dan Dungaciu pe situl Universităţii din București
 Proiect la care participă Dan Dungaciu
 Articole de Dan Dungaciu, publicate în ziarul Timpul din Chişinău
 Text şi audio despre lansarea cărţii din 2009

Notes 

1968 births
Euronova Media Group
Geopoliticians
Living people
People from Târgu Mureș
Romanian people of Moldovan descent
Romanian sociologists
Recipients of the Order of Honour (Moldova)
University of Bucharest alumni
Academic staff of the University of Bucharest